The following is a list of international bilateral treaties between Australia and Finland

 Early treaties were extended to Australia by the British Empire, however they are still generally in force.
 European Union treaties, extended to Finland are not included below.

References

Treaties of Australia
Treaties of Finland